Carnarvonia may refer to:
 Carnarvonia (plant), a genus of plants in the family Proteaceae
 Carnarvonia (animal), an extinct genus of arthropod